Elachista mundula is a moth of the family Elachistidae. It is found in South Australia, Victoria and Tasmania.

The forewings are ochreous white and the hindwings are pale grey.

The larvae feed on Gahnia sieberiana. They mine the leaves of their host plant. Young larvae mine downwards, creating a narrow initial gallery. Later, the mine gradually widens and reaches a length of 100–120 mm. Pupation takes place outside of the mine on a leaf of the host plant.

References

Moths described in 2011
Endemic fauna of Australia
mundula
Moths of Australia
Taxa named by Lauri Kaila